Ujae Atoll (Marshallese:  or) is a coral atoll of 15 islands in the Pacific Ocean, and forms a legislative district of the Ralik Chain of the Marshall Islands.

History

In folklore, the Marshallese people have long considered the island to be home to timon (demons).

Its first recorded sighting was by the Spanish expedition of Álvaro de Saavedra on 21 September 1529. Another sighting was reported by the Spanish expedition of Ruy López de Villalobos in January 1543.

In 1884, the Empire of Germany claimed Ujae Atoll along with the rest of the Marshall Islands. After World War I, the island came under the South Seas Mandate of the Empire of Japan. The island became part of the vast US Naval Base Marshall Islands. Following the end of World War II, it came under the control of the United States as part of the Trust Territory of the Pacific Islands until the independence of the Marshall Islands in 1986.

In 2011, the population of Ujae Atoll was 364.

Education
Marshall Islands Public School System operates Ujae Elementary School. Kwajalein Atoll High School on Kwajalein serves the community.

References

External links
Marshall Islands site

Atolls of the Marshall Islands
Ralik Chain
Municipalities of the Marshall Islands